John Dickson may refer to:

Politicians
John Dickson (MP), British Member of Parliament for Peeblesshire
John Dickson (New York politician) (1783–1852), U.S. Representative from New York
John Dickson (Australian politician), politician in colonial New South Wales
John Dickson (diplomat) (1847–1906), a member of the British Levant Consular Service

Sportsmen
John Dickson (footballer) (1949–1998), Scottish footballer
John Dickson (basketball) (born 1945), former ABA basketball player

Arts and entertainment 

John Dickson (American poet) (1916–2009)
John Dickson (New Zealand poet) (1944–2017)
John Dickson, film and television composer, see Burn Notice

Others
John Dickson, Lord Hartree, Scottish judge
John Dickson (minister) 17th century minister from Rutherglen. Scots Worthy and prisoner on the Bass Rock
John Dickson (priest) Archdeacon of Down, 1796–1814
John Dickson (railway contractor) (c. 1819–1892)
John Dickson (author), Australian Christian author
John Dickson (civil servant) (1915–1994), Scottish forester and public official
John B. Dickson (born 1943), American leader in The Church of Jesus Christ of Latter-day Saints
John Dickson, pseudonym of Sigrid Schultz (1893–1980), American war correspondent
John F. Dickson (1821–1880), American public servant, law enforcement officer and police captain
John Frederick Dickson (1835–1891), British colonial administrator in Singapore

Organisations
John Dickson & Son, Scottish gunmaker

See also
John Dickson Carr (1906–1977), American author of detective stories
John Dixon (disambiguation)
John Dickerson (disambiguation)